Francis "Earl" Devore (December 2, 1889 – November 12, 1928) was an American racecar driver. Devore and fellow driver Norman Batten were aboard the SS Vestris ocean liner when it sank. He is credited with saving the lives of his wife, and Batten's wife. Both Batten and Devore were lost at sea. Reports indicate that Devore was eaten by a shark in the icy waters. His son Billy also become a racecar driver.

Indianapolis 500 results

References
 Old Racing Cars page
 Motorsport Memorial page

1889 births
1928 deaths
Deaths due to shipwreck at sea
Indianapolis 500 drivers
People from Stafford County, Kansas
Racing drivers from Kansas
AAA Championship Car drivers
Deaths due to shark attacks